Wilson Ruffin Abbott (1801 – 1876) was an American-born Black Canadian and successful businessman and landowner in Toronto, Ontario. He was the father of Anderson Ruffin Abbott, Canada's first Black physician.

Biography
Born to a Scotch-Irish father and a free West African mother in Richmond, Virginia, Wilson Ruffin Abbott left home when he was aged 15 to work as a steward on a Mississippi River steamer.

He married Ellen Toyer, and moved to [akorn ohio]], where he opened a general grocery store, but left in 1834 after receiving a warning that his store was to be pillaged. In late 1835 or early 1836, he moved to Toronto, Upper Canada, where he prospered as a businessman. He served in the militia that protected Toronto from the rebels in the 1837 Upper Canada Rebellion and was elected to Toronto city council in 1840.

His son Anderson Ruffin Abbott in 1861 became the first African Canadian to practise medicine.

Death 
Wilson Ruffin Abbott died at age 75 in Toronto.

References

Sources

 
 
 
 

1801 births
1876 deaths
American emigrants to pre-Confederation Ontario
American people of Scotch-Irish descent
Businesspeople from Richmond, Virginia
Businesspeople from Toronto
Politicians from Richmond, Virginia
Canadian people of African-American descent
Canadian people of Ulster-Scottish descent
People from Old Toronto
Pre-Confederation Canadian businesspeople
Toronto city councillors
Immigrants to Upper Canada
Black Canadian businesspeople
Black Canadian politicians
Upper Canada Rebellion people
19th-century American businesspeople
Burials at Toronto Necropolis